HK MŠK Indian Žiar nad Hronom is an ice hockey team in Žiar nad Hronom, Slovakia. They play in the Slovak 1. Liga, the third level of ice hockey in Slovakia.

History
The beginnings of ice hockey in Žiar nad Hronom date back to 1952–53, when the enthusiasm of some young people for this sport gave rise to the establishment of a hockey team. The formed men's team competed within the district and the region. The whole organizational work was based on several volunteer officials and the players themselves, who prepared the ice and lighting themselves. Initially, it was played on the old playground by the stream, later in the premises of the I. ZDŠ, then in the park on the site of the current tennis courts and finally on the site of the current winter stadium.

Notable players
 Marek Uram
 Jozef Stümpel

References

External links
Official website 
 

Žiar nad Hronom
1952 establishments in Czechoslovakia
Ice hockey clubs established in 1952
Žiar nad Hronom District
Sport in Banská Bystrica Region